Jo Pok-Hyang (born 15 November 1992) is a North Korean weighlifter. She competed at the 2013 World Championships in the Women's 63 kg, winning the Silver medal. Jo represents the Kigwancha Sports Team.

References

North Korean female weightlifters
1992 births
Living people
World Weightlifting Championships medalists
Weightlifters at the 2014 Asian Games
Asian Games medalists in weightlifting
Asian Games bronze medalists for North Korea
Medalists at the 2014 Asian Games
21st-century North Korean women